Willem Bouma (born July 27, 1972) is a Dutch-Canadian politician, who was elected to the Legislative Assembly of Ontario in the 2018 provincial election. He represents the riding of Brantford—Brant as a member of the Progressive Conservative Party. Before becoming an MPP, Bouma practised optometry and was a member of the Brant County Council.

Early life and optometry career
Born in the village of Rinsumageast in The Netherlands, Bouma's family moved to Ontario when he was four years old. His parents operated a dairy farm near Forest, Ontario. Bouma attended the University of Waterloo, and graduated with a Bachelor of Science in 1995. He then studied at the Michigan College of Optometry, graduating in 1999. He practiced optometry in Michigan for seven years, but moved back to Ontario in 2006, settling in St. George, where he established an optometry office.

Politics
Bouma served in several community positions before he ran for office, including the Brant County Committee of Adjustment; the Brant County Board of Health; and as president of the Brant Waterways Foundation.

Brant County Council
In 2014, he ran for the Brant County Council in ward 1, which consists of the rural areas in the north of the municipality. Bouma placed second in the election, 28 votes behind incumbent councillor John Wheat, winning one of the two seats.

Provincial Parliament
Bouma ran to succeed retiring MPP Dave Levac in the 2018 provincial election. He was nominated by the Brantford—Brant Progressive Conservative Riding Association on April 8, 2017. Bouma's campaign focused primarily on cost-of-living, healthcare, hydro prices, and taxation. Bouma defeated NDP candidate Alex Felsky in the June 7 election, winning by 635 votes (1.09%).

Bouma was sworn-in on July 11, 2018. In June 2019, he was appointed Parliamentary Assistant to the Premier.

Abortion controversy
Bouma, along with fellow Progressive Conservative MPPs Christina Mitas and Sam Oosterhoff, spoke at an anti-abortion rally in Queen's Park in May 2019. Bouma quoted from the Bible, while Oosterhoff pledged to "make abortion unthinkable in our lifetime". This drew criticism from parts of the Progressive Conservative Party, as well as the New Democratic Official Opposition. The Brantford—Brant NDP issued a statement calling Bouma's comments "archaic", and Opposition Leader Andrea Horwath said that she was "horrified" that the MPPs' participation in the demonstration. Following the rally, Premier Doug Ford said that he would not re-open the abortion debate. Demonstrators on both sides of the issue gathered outside of Bouma's office in Brantford on May 31, 2019.

Personal life
Bouma lives in the town of St. George with his wife Joni and their five children.  He is a member of the Free Reformed Churches of North America.

Electoral record

 

{|
|valign=top width=10%|

References

Progressive Conservative Party of Ontario MPPs
21st-century Canadian politicians
People from the County of Brant
Living people
Canadian optometrists
1972 births